The USB video device class (also USB video class or UVC) is a USB device class that describes devices capable of streaming video like webcams, digital camcorders, analog video converters, and still-image cameras.

This page holds a list of known UVC-compatible devices, arranged by category.  References are included.

Webcams 

Format: Product Name, Part Number, Reference

* These devices also have non-UVC equivalents by the same name. Please check the product number to confirm UVC compatibility.

Any webcam which is logo certified for Microsoft Windows Vista is UVC compatible, as this is a Vista logo requirement set by Microsoft.

Logitech webcams supporting UVC on Windows 8 and Windows 10 can found in this page: http://support.logitech.com/en_us/article/32436

Further UVC models can be found on the Linux UVC pages: http://www.ideasonboard.org/uvc/#devices

Converters/Adapters

References

Computing-related lists
Video class devices